Life's a Breeze is a 2013 Irish comedy film directed and written by Lance Daly. It was screened in the Contemporary World Cinema section at the 2013 Toronto International Film Festival.

Synopsis
A family of middle-aged children decides to clean out years of accumulated stuff from their elderly mother's residencewithout her knowledge. So, one morning, they task (by bribing) her teenage granddaughter to take the cranky old lady out for the day. Upon returning in the early evening, and after the family shows her all the new household items and furniture, and how clean the place now is, retired school teacher Nan informs them all that she had stored 50 years of savings (from pension income, renting the basement apartment, what she had previously inherited, and, as she puts it, “whatever your Dad didn’t drink”) in her mattress, amounting to almost a million euros.

Stunned, the family launches an all-out search for the mattress, which was presumably hauled away to the dump. Complications arise, and hilarity ensues.

Cast
 Kelly Thornton as Emma
 Fionnula Flanagan as Nan
 Pat Shortt as Colm
 Eva Birthistle as Margaret
 Philip Judge as Michael

References

External links 
 
 
 

2013 films
2013 comedy films
English-language Irish films
Films set in Ireland
Irish comedy films
2010s English-language films